Viman Nagar is a residential and retail neighborhood in the Eastern Metropolitan Corridor of Pune and is one of the regions in the city. Viman Nagar is in close proximity to the Pune International Airport.

During the Pre-independence era, the neighborhood was known as Dunkirk Lines. The vibrant Viman Nagar is strewn with plush residential complexes, bustling corporate offices, fine-dining restaurants, and glitzy shopping malls. The locality enjoys easy accessibility to work, leisure as well as high-profile educational institutions thus boasting one of the highest property rates in real estate in the entire state of Maharashtra, making it a prestigious and highly sought residential destination.

Location
Viman Nagar is located 8 kilometers North off the Pune Railway Station and 0.5 kilometers South off the Pune International Airport.

Geography

Northbound: Pune International Airport
Westbound: Yerawada
Central: Lohagaon
Southbound: Vadgaon Sheri
Eastbound: Kharadi, Hadapsar, Wagholi

Demographics

Roads
The Pune-Ahmednagar Highway (Maharashtra State Highway 27/MH-SH-27) passes through Viman Nagar.

Hotels
Viman Nagar is home to the following International Chain of Hotels:
Hyatt Regency
Novotel
Ibis
Four Points by Sheraton
Lemon Tree Hotels
The Hotel Hindusthan International
Bhooj Adda, Bengali restaurant

Educational Institutions
Symbiosis Institute of Design
Symbiosis School of Liberal Arts 
 Symbiosis Law School
 Air Force School, Pune
Symbiosis Institute of Business Management
Symbiosis School of Media & Communication
International Institute of Hotel Management (IIHM, Pune)

Nearby landmarks
 Pune International Airport
 Viman Nagar Joggers' Park, Pune
 Aga Khan Palace
 Fly India Paramotor Club (Paragliding)
 Phoenix Market City
 Udaan Bio-Diversity Park by Zensar has collaborated with the Pune Municipal Corporation for transforming a 2 Acre Barren Area into a Bio-Diversity Park at Vimannagar on Lease Basis. The park is experiential and educative, addressing all senses: the use of colorful plants proximate to the entrance welcomes visitors (sight), followed by a segment comprising medicinally therapeutic herbs (touch and taste), aromatic herbs (smell), the use of bird-friendly trees (sound) and a 500sqft water body (sight). What makes this park different is that it encourages visitors to pluck and taste, rub and smell, extending interaction from the visual to the experiential. Through this experiential interaction, guided by helpful signages, visitors are able to appreciate the therapeutic influence of Tulsi or Neem leaves and also learn about the plants as the source of various household remedies. The park attracts a number of schools on educational excursions. Another unique aspect of the Park is the trail with braille signages which help engage visually-challenged visitors. The park attracts more than 300 visitors a day comprising leisure walkers, picnickers, and students.
 Named after the remarkable starting shooting guard of the SIS inter-school team - Shivansh Dutt Basketball Court is positioned north-east of the campus. The elite sportsman went on to follow his passion in the city of Edmonton, Canada after graduating.
 Viman Nagar Rollerskating Rink
 Ansh Kapadia Football Ground - named after the Symbiosis International School alumnus - is located east of the campus. A skilled and versatile player, he went on to play in Toronto, Canada. The ground was named after him in his honour.

See also
 BRTS
Pune Metro
 Phoenix Marketcity

References

External links
 CNG pumping stations
 Water meter pilot project

Neighbourhoods in Pune